Denis Perez (born 25 April 1965 in Caen, France), is a French ice hockey player and coach. He competed at five consecutive Olympics from 1988 to 2002, thus becoming the fifth hockey player to do so after Udo Kießling (Germany), Petter Thoresen (Norway), Raimo Helminen (Finland), and Dieter Hegen (Germany).

Career
Perez played most of his career in the Ligue Magnus, the top division of professional ice hockey in France, with the exception of a year in Germany. He began his career at Hockey Club de Caen in 1983, where he stayed for a year before joining Français Volants for five seasons. He played for Dragons de Rouen from 1989 to 1997, Adler Mannheim from 1998 to 1999, Anglet Hormadi Élite from 1999 to 2001 and Gothiques d'Amiens from 2001 to 2005.

He is now the coach for Gothiques d'Amiens.

Career statistics

Regular season and playoffs

FRA totals do not include stats from the 2000–01 and 2001–02 seasons.

International

References

External links

See also
 List of athletes with the most appearances at Olympic Games

1965 births
Living people
Adler Mannheim players
Anglet Hormadi Élite players
Drakkars de Caen players
French ice hockey defencemen
Gothiques d'Amiens players
Ice hockey players at the 1988 Winter Olympics
Ice hockey players at the 1992 Winter Olympics
Ice hockey players at the 1994 Winter Olympics
Ice hockey players at the 1998 Winter Olympics
Ice hockey players at the 2002 Winter Olympics
Olympic ice hockey players of France
Rouen HE 76 players
Sportspeople from Caen
French expatriate sportspeople in Germany
Expatriate ice hockey players in Germany
French expatriate ice hockey people
French ice hockey coaches